Cercone is an Italian surname.

Notable people with this surname include:

David Cercone (born 1952), American judge
Ettore Cercone, Italian painter
Janus Cercone, American screenwriter
Matt Cercone (1975–2009), American football player
Robert Cercone, American actor
William F. Cercone (1913–2005), American prosecutor and judge

Italian-language surnames